Chilikar is a rural locality (a selo) in Koshkentsky Selsoviet, Khivsky District, Republic of Dagestan, Russia. The population was 485 as of 2010. There are 10 streets.

Geography 
Chilikar is located 16 km southeast of Khiv (the district's administrative centre) by road. Koshkent is the nearest rural locality.

References 

Rural localities in Khivsky District